Julie Ju-young Chang was the Entertainment Anchor for Good Day L.A. and Fox 11 Morning News on KTTV in Los Angeles, joining the station in November 2012 to May 2020. Previously, she was the entertainment anchor for the 5 p.m. and 10 p.m. news on FOX 5 WNYW. She joined the morning show Good Day New York in June 2008, but changed over to the evening newscasts in October 2011. Previously, she was a feature reporter for the CW11 Morning News, WPIX. Chang has been recognized for her work with a New York State Associated Press Award and a 2007 Emmy nomination.

Early life
Originally from South Korea, Chang moved to Ann Arbor, Michigan, when she was nine years old. Six years later, her parents returned to Korea, but Chang stayed in the United States with her older sisters. A graduate of the University of Michigan with a B.A. in economics, Chang also studied Environmental Studies at Oxford University in Oxford, England.

Career
After originally pursuing a career in banking, Chang found her calling in 2000 after spending a semester at sea. She sailed around the world, spending time in such varied locations as Cuba, Brazil, South Africa, Kenya, India, Malaysia, Vietnam, Hong Kong, China and Japan. The voyage gave birth to her passion: story telling which can expose, educate and enlighten her viewing audience.

While at WPIX, Chang covered both breaking and feature news. She also hosted the "Truly Julie" segment on the CW11 Morning News. She was featured in the February 2007 issue of high fashion magazine W, for which she was photographed by Philip-Lorca diCorcia. Chang has also appeared in fashion magazine Lucky and lifestyle magazine New York Moves. She had a minor part playing herself in the 2011 feature film The Smurfs.

Chang left CW11 at the end of February 2008. She joined Fox 5 New York on June 16, 2008, and worked there until September 2012. Chang later moved to WNYW's sister station, KTTV, where since October 2012, she has been the Entertainment Anchor for Good Day LA and the Fox 11 Morning News. In mid-November 2013, it was announced that she would be taking medical leave to treat a brain tumor. On January 22, 2014, Chang returned from medical leave.

In May 2020, Chang decided to leave Good Day LA

References

External links
 Julie Chang, FOX 5
 www.TrulyJulieChang.com

Alumni of the University of Oxford
American television journalists
American women television journalists
Living people
South Korean emigrants to the United States
New York (state) television reporters
University of Michigan College of Literature, Science, and the Arts alumni
Year of birth missing (living people)
People from Ann Arbor, Michigan
21st-century American women